Thierry Foucaud (born 18 January 1954) is a member of the Senate of France, representing the Seine-Maritime department. He is a member of the Communist, Republican, Citizen and Ecologist group. He has been vice-president of the Senate since 2011.

References
Page on the Senate website 

1954 births
Living people
French Senators of the Fifth Republic
Vice-presidents of the Senate (France)
Senators of Seine-Maritime
Place of birth missing (living people)
21st-century French politicians